The Rur Eifel lies in the district of Düren in the German state of North Rhine-Westphalia, and is a local recreation area from the regions of Cologne, Aachen, Düsseldorf, Krefeld, Mönchengladbach and Bonn. Its name comes from the river Rur and the Eifel Mountains.

The Rur Eifel geographically includes the towns of Nideggen, Heimbach and Schleiden as well as the municipalities of Hürtgenwald, Kreuzau and  Hellenthal. This holiday and day-excursion region is widely known for having the second largest dam in Europe, the Schwammenauel, or Rur Dam, the Eifel National Park and the North Eifel Nature Park.

External links 
 Home page of Rur Eifel tourism
 Walking in the Rur Eifel

Regions of North Rhine-Westphalia
Regions of the Eifel